Dan Simrell (born April 9, 1943) is an American football coach. He was the quarterbacks coach at Olivet College in Olivet, Michigan from 2015 to 2019.  Simrell served as the head football coach at the University of Toledo from 1982 to 1989 and at the University of Findlay from 2000 to 2006.

Head coaching record

College

References

External links
 Olivet profile

1943 births
Living people
American football quarterbacks
American football safeties
Findlay Oilers football coaches
Olivet Comets football coaches
Toledo Rockets football coaches
Toledo Rockets football players
Trine Thunder football coaches
Memphis Tigers football coaches
West Virginia Mountaineers football coaches
High school football coaches in Ohio